Rosana dos Santos Augusto (born 7 July 1982), commonly known as Rosana, is a Brazilian football coach and former left back or left winger who last played for Palmeiras. She played professionally for teams in Brazil, Austria, France, Norway and the United States. Since making her debut for the Brazil women's national football team in June 2000, she won over a century of caps. She has participated in four FIFA Women's World Cups and four editions of the Olympic Games.

Club career
Rosana played for several years in Brazil before moving to Austria in 2004. There she played as a left winger for SV Neulengbach. In 2005–06 she was the ÖFB-Frauenliga's top goal scorer, with 26 goals.

At the 2008 WPS International Draft Rosana was selected by Sky Blue FC of Women's Professional Soccer (WPS). In her first season she scored five goals from a central playmaking role. Teammate Yael Averbuch questioned Rosana's defensive capabilities: "for some reason, whenever we meet about defending, the usually quite fluent Rosana no longer speaks or understands English!"

She signed with French UEFA Women's Champions League title holders Olympique Lyon in September 2011. From February 2011 until September she had been back in Brazilian football, playing for Centro Olímpico.

In summer 2013 Rosana joined Norwegian club Avaldsnes. She recommended that the club's owners also sign her compatriot, Debinha, at the same time. In one-and-a-half seasons in Norway, Rosana and Debinha became key players, with Rosana becoming captain of the team.

Rosana played for São José in the 2014 International Women's Club Championship. She scored in the Brazilian club's 2–0 final win over English wild card entrant Arsenal Ladies. She agreed a return to the United States, with National Women's Soccer League (NWSL) team Houston Dash, in December 2014.

Before Rosana could play for Houston she was included in an 18-month residency programme intended to prepare Brazil's national team for the 2015 FIFA Women's World Cup in Canada and the 2016 Rio Olympics. She finished the 2015 season back in Norway with Avaldsnes, and scored in the Norwegian Women's Cup final, which Avaldsnes lost 3–2 to LSK Kvinner FK. In January 2016 Rosana joined French club Paris Saint-Germain. She returned to Brazilian football with São José in August 2016.

The North Carolina Courage signed Rosana on 10 January 2017, after acquiring her rights in a deal brokered by the Courage's prior organization, the Western New York Flash. She appeared in 4 matches before being waived on 21 June 2017, due to a lack of playing time with the Courage and opportunities to play elsewhere. After spending the 2018 season with Santos, Rosana announced her retirement from football.

In 2020 she came out of retirement to play for Palmeiras, before retiring again in February 2021 and joining Club Athletico Paranaense as the coach of their new women's team.

International career
In June 2000 Rosana made her international debut in Brazil's 8–0 CONCACAF Women's Gold Cup win over Costa Rica at Hersheypark Stadium, Hershey, Pennsylvania. As an 18-year-old she played at the 2000 Sydney Olympics, where Brazil finished fourth after losing 2–0 to Germany in the bronze medal match at Sydney Football Stadium.

At the 2003 South American Women's Football Championship, Rosana scored Brazil's third goal in a 3–2 win over Argentina which ensured qualification for that year's FIFA Women's World Cup. At the final tournament in the United States she performed well and scored as Brazil upset Olympic champions Norway 4–1. Sweden defeated Brazil 2–1 in the quarter-final.

Rosana was a member of the national team that won the silver medal at both the 2004 and 2008 Olympic Football Tournaments. She was a substitute in the 2007 FIFA Women's World Cup Final, which Brazil lost 2–0 to Germany. At the tournament Rosana and teammates Marta, Cristiane and Daniela were nicknamed "the fantastic four".

In Brazil's victorious 2007 Pan American Games campaign, Rosana twice scored from free kicks, against both Canada and Mexico. This led to comparisons with contemporary male footballer Ronaldinho.

At the 2011 FIFA Women's World Cup Rosana scored Brazil's goal in a 1–0 win over Australia and the second in a 3–0 win over dispirited Norway. Brazil then lost a controversial quarter-final on penalties to the United States after a 2–2 draw. Rosana had been substituted out for Francielle with five minutes of normal time remaining.

In an interview with FIFA.com ahead of the 2012 London Olympics, Rosana still regretted the manner of Brazil's World Cup defeat the previous year. At the Olympics, Rosana and Brazil lost their final group E game 1–0 to hosts Great Britain before a record crowd of 70,584 at Wembley Stadium. That meant a quarter-final against World Cup holders Japan, who eliminated Brazil by winning 2–0 at Cardiff's Millennium Stadium.

At the 2015 FIFA Women's World Cup in Canada, Rosana appeared in one of Brazil's four matches, starting the 1–0 final group game win over Costa Rica. In October 2017 Rosana was one of five Brazil players to quit international football, disgruntled at pay and conditions, and the Brazilian Football Confederation's sacking of head coach Emily Lima.

International goals

Personal life
Rosana was both Minas Gerais state and national champion in kung fu.

References

External links

 
 Sky Blue FC player profile
 Profile at Norwegian Football Association (NFF) 
 

1982 births
Living people
Brazilian women's footballers
Brazil women's international footballers
Brazilian expatriate women's footballers
Women's association football wingers
Olympic footballers of Brazil
Olympic silver medalists for Brazil
Footballers at the 2007 Pan American Games
Footballers at the 2011 Pan American Games
Footballers at the 2000 Summer Olympics
Footballers at the 2004 Summer Olympics
Footballers at the 2008 Summer Olympics
Footballers at the 2012 Summer Olympics
Footballers from São Paulo
NJ/NY Gotham FC players
2003 FIFA Women's World Cup players
2007 FIFA Women's World Cup players
2011 FIFA Women's World Cup players
2015 FIFA Women's World Cup players
Olympic medalists in football
Medalists at the 2008 Summer Olympics
Medalists at the 2004 Summer Olympics
Brazilian expatriate sportspeople in Norway
Expatriate women's footballers in Norway
Olympique Lyonnais Féminin players
Paris Saint-Germain Féminine players
Expatriate women's footballers in France
Toppserien players
Avaldsnes IL players
Associação Desportiva Centro Olímpico players
Expatriate women's footballers in Austria
SV Neulengbach (women) players
FIFA Century Club
Pan American Games gold medalists for Brazil
Pan American Games silver medalists for Brazil
São José Esporte Clube (women) players
North Carolina Courage players
Pan American Games medalists in football
Brazilian expatriate sportspeople in Austria
Brazilian expatriate sportspeople in France
Brazilian expatriate sportspeople in the United States
Expatriate sportspeople in Spain
Expatriate sportspeople in Germany
Sport Club Corinthians Paulista (women) players
National Women's Soccer League players
Division 1 Féminine players
Santos FC (women) players
ÖFB-Frauenliga players
Medalists at the 2007 Pan American Games
Medalists at the 2011 Pan American Games
São Paulo FC (women) players
Sociedade Esportiva Palmeiras (women) players
Women's Professional Soccer players